The 2019 Broxbourne Borough Council election took place on 3 May 2018 to elect members of the Broxbourne Borough Council in England. This was on the same day as other local elections. The Conservatives retained control of the council.

Results summary

Ward results

Broxbourne & Hoddesdon South

Cheshunt North

Cheshunt South & Theobalds

Flamstead End

Goffs Oak

Hoddesdon North

Hoddesdon Town & Rye Park

Rosedale & Bury Green

Waltham Cross

Wormley & Turnford

References

2018 English local elections
May 2018 events in the United Kingdom
2018
2010s in Hertfordshire